Thathamma is a fortnightly comic magazine in Malayalam. The magazine is published in English by Balasangam state committee Kerala.

Content 
Thathamma targets children. The magazine, which features stories, cartoons, and comics, emphasizes moral values and aims at enhancing knowledge through humor and hobbies. Its sister publication is Deshabhimani, a political paper founded on 6 September 1942. ONV Kurup served as the editor-in-chief of Thathamma.

References

Biweekly magazines published in India
Children's magazines published in India
English-language magazines published in India
Malayalam comics
Malayalam-language magazines
Magazines about comics
Mass media in Kerala
Magazines with year of establishment missing